Siaosi Toutoupau'u "Fili" Moala (born June 23, 1985) is a former American football defensive end. He played college football at Southern California, and was drafted by the Indianapolis Colts in the second round of the 2009 NFL Draft.

Early years
Moala was the only son in a five-child family and was not permitted by his mother to play football until high school; however he did participate in basketball and baseball.  Moala played high school football at Western High School in Anaheim, California, where he was teammates with Mike Iupati. As a senior in 2002 he was a  Super Prep All-Farwest, Prep Star All-West, Tom Lemming All-West and Tacoma News Tribune Western 100 selection.

College career

Moala originally signed with the University of Southern California in 2003, but did not qualify for admission.  He attended Cypress College for one year, but did not play football there, before transferring into USC.  During his first year at USC in 2004 he was redshirted. In 2005 he started two games for the Trojans recording eight tackles.

During his sophomore season in 2006, Moala pushed for and eventually won the starting spot, starting the last seven games and received All-Pac-10 honorable mention. He finished the season with 20 tackles, 2½ sacks, and one fumble recovery. As a junior in 2007 he started all 13 games recording 33 tackles, 2½ sacks, and was an All-Pac-10 honorable mention.

With the departure of top-10 draft pick defensive tackle Sedrick Ellis, Moala was expected to step up on the Trojans' defensive line in the 2008 season.  In the off-season and into the beginning of the 2008 season, Moala suffered from back spasms that limited his time in practices; he did not register a tackle during the 52–7 rout against the Trojans' first opponent, Virginia, which ran a spread offense that did not emphasize the run.  Moala showed marked improvements in the following game against Ohio State, where he made a sack and contributed to a defensive line that had 6½ tackles for losses, including five sacks.  Moala had a strong game against Arizona State, where he made three tackles, recovered a fumble, and blocked two third-quarter field goal attempts, tying the NCAA record for blocked field goals in a quarter.

Professional career

2009 NFL Draft
Entering his senior season, Moala began receiving heavy media attention as one of the best defensive linemen going into the season and a potential top-2009 NFL Draft pick in early mock drafts, with ESPN's draft expert Todd McShay naming him a possible first pick.

He was considered one of the best defensive tackle prospects for the 2009 NFL Draft. However, durability concerns let him slip to the second round.

Moala was drafted by the Indianapolis Colts in the second round of the 2009 NFL Draft.

Indianapolis Colts
Moala re-signed with the Colts to a one-year contract on March 4, 2013. He re-signed with the Colts again on March 10, 2014.

Houston Texans
On August 19, 2015, Moala signed a one-year contract with the Houston Texans.

Personal life
Moala has been married to Jordan Moala since May 2009. The couple have five children, Litani, June, Anabelle, Faamika, and Ascieli, and they reside in Santa Ana, California.

Three of Moala's cousins have played at either Oregon State or Oregon: Tevita Moala (Oregon State, 1999–2000), Haloti Ngata (Oregon, 2002–2005), and Eric Moala (Oregon State, 2005–2006).

References

External links
Indianapolis Colts bio
USC Trojans bio

1985 births
Living people
American people of Tongan descent
People from Buena Park, California
Players of American football from California
Sportspeople from Orange County, California
American football defensive tackles
USC Trojans football players
Indianapolis Colts players
Houston Texans players